Sphaeropleaceae is a family of green algae in the order Sphaeropleales.

References

Chlorophyceae families
Sphaeropleales